Isabel of Barcelos (October 1402 – 26 October 1466), also known as Isabel of Braganza, was a lady of the Portuguese nobility during the Late Middle Ages. She was the daughter of Afonso I, Duke of Braganza and Beatriz Pereira de Alvim, and she married Infante John, Lord of Reguengos de Monsaraz, her half-uncle, son of John I of Portugal.

Issue
Isabel and Infante John had four children:
Infante Diogo of Portugal (1425–1443) – 4th Constable of Portugal and 11th Master of the Order of St. James;
Infanta Isabella of Portugal (1428–1496), married John II of Castile, mother of Isabella I of Castile
Infanta Beatrice of Portugal (1430–1506), married Infante Ferdinand, Duke of Viseu, mother of Manuel I of Portugal
Infanta Phillipa of Portugal (1432–1444), Lady of Almada

Isabel died in the town of Arévalo on 26 October 1466 at the age of sixty-four. She was buried in the Batalha Monastery alongside her husband.

Ancestry

References 

1402 births
1466 deaths
Braganza
House of Braganza
People from Barcelos, Portugal
15th-century Portuguese people
15th-century Portuguese women